Juan Carlos Baumgartner (born February 27, 1972) is a Mexican architect, founder and CEO of the Chicago-based international architecture firm SPACE.

Education

Juan Carlos Baumgartner graduated from the College of Architecture of Mexico’s National University and has diplomas in interior design from the UNAM’s College of Architecture, Art History from Berkley University in California, and a postgraduate degree in Industrial Design from Domus Academy in Milan.

Career

In 1999 he founded the renowned architecture firm SPACE in the city of Chicago.

From its very beginning, the firm, under Baumgartner’s leadership, has gained notoriety for its commitment with the environment and developing sustainable projects, which got him and his team the LEED (Leadership in Energy & Environmental Design) certification, awarded by the US Green Building Council. Some of his most well known projects include:

The Google Mexico offices, the EFIZIA tower, for which Baumgartner received a commendation in the 2009 MIPIM Architectural Review Future Projects Awards, the Chapultepec Polanco tower, the Moras 850 project (certified Gold LEEDS), and the MSN Mexico offices.

Baumgartner has taught at top universities such as TEC Monterrey, Universidad Iberoamericana, Universidad Anahuac, and UNAM in Mexico, and Virginia Tech and MIT in the United States.

Awards and recognition

 2004 – Revista Obras – 10 Promises of Mexican Architecture
 2006 – Excellence Award - Sociedad Mexicana de Interioristas / International Federation of Interior Architects
 2007 – Promoter of Green Design Award - Sociedad Mexicana de Interioristas / International Federation of Interior Architects
 2008 – Best sustainable design – Premio AMDI
 2008 – Best Sustainable Project – Sociedad Mexicana de Diseñadores de Interiores
 2008 – Gold Merit Medal – Bienal Internacional de Arquitectura
 2009 – National Interiors Award – AMDI
 2011 – Design Icon (interior design category) – Architectural Digest Magazine

References

External links
 SPACE sitio oficial

1972 births
Living people
Mexican architects